The 2017 Newfoundland and Labrador Women's Curling Championship, the women's provincial curling championship for Newfoundland and Labrador, was held from January 26 to 29 at the Bally Haly Golf & Curling Club in St. John's, Newfoundland and Labrador. The winning Stacie Curtis rink represented Newfoundland and Labrador at the 2017 Scotties Tournament of Hearts from the Meridian Centre in St. Catharines.

The event was held in conjunction with the 2017 Newfoundland and Labrador Tankard, the men's provincial championship which was held at the same time.

Stacie Curtis won her fourth provincial championship, after defeating another former provincial champion, Shelley Hardy in the final.

Teams
Teams are as follows:

Round robin standings

Round robin results
"x" indicates team with the hammer in the first end.

January 26
Draw 1
Strong 7-5x Curtis
Hamilton 7x-10 Hardy

Draw 2
Strong 10x-4 Miller (9 ends)  
Curtis 9x-5 Hamilton

January 27
Draw 3
Hamilton 3-8x Miller (6 ends)
Curtis 8-5x Hardy

Draw 4
Strong 4x-7 Hamilton 
Miller 4x-10 Hardy (8 ends)

January 28
Draw 5
Strong 2x-9 Hardy (6 ends)
Curtis 8x-2 Miller (5 ends)

Final

Saturday, January 28, 2:30p NST

References

External links
Scores

Newfoundland and Labrador
Sport in St. John's, Newfoundland and Labrador
Curling in Newfoundland and Labrador
2017 in Newfoundland and Labrador
January 2017 sports events in Canada